Transformers: Dark of the Moon – The Score is a soundtrack that features the musical score by composer Steve Jablonsky for the 2011 live-action film Transformers: Dark of the Moon. It was released on June 24, 2011, five days before the actual release of the film. The song "Heed Our Warning" features in the Transformers: Revenge of the Fallen score but was featured in the film when Sentinel Prime, the Decepticons and spaceships attacked Chicago.

The score was once available on iTunes, but was later removed, along with its sequel, Transformers: Age of Extinction - The Score, once it reached a limit of having sold 15000 units before re-use fees would have to be paid, much to the disappointment of Steve Jablonsky and fans alike. Jablonsky hopes to eventually re-release the score along with the score for Age of Extinction (which shared a similar fate regarding reaching aforementioned limit) at some point in the future.

Track listing

References

External links
 Official album website
 Official movie website

Dark of the Moon – The Score
2011 soundtrack albums
2010s film soundtrack albums
Film scores